The Odd Fellows Building in Raleigh, North Carolina, also known as the Commerce Building, is a 10-story skyscraper built in 1923.  It reflects Late 19th and Early 20th Century American Movements architecture and Classical Revival architecture and consists of the classic base-shaft-capital design. The Odd Fellows (IOOF) Building served as a meeting hall for the Independent Order of Odd Fellows and as a business.

It was listed on the National Register of Historic Places in 1997.

See also
Commerce Building (disambiguation)
Independent Order of Odd Fellows - IOOF

References

Commercial buildings on the National Register of Historic Places in North Carolina
Neoclassical architecture in North Carolina
Buildings and structures in Raleigh, North Carolina
Odd Fellows buildings in North Carolina
Skyscraper office buildings in Raleigh, North Carolina
Clubhouses on the National Register of Historic Places in North Carolina
National Register of Historic Places in Raleigh, North Carolina
Office buildings completed in 1923